This is a list of monasteries and convents in Malta and Gozo:

De La Salle Brothers (Freres), with their monastery at Cottonera Road, Birgu
Little Sisters of the Poor (Sorijiet iż-Żgħar tal-Foqra), with their monastery at Little Sisters Street, Ħamrun
St. Peter's Monastery (Monasteru San Pietru) at Villegaignon Street, Mdina
St. Catherine's Monastery (Monasteru Santa Katarina) at Republic Street, Valletta
St. Clare's Monastery (Monasteru Santa Klara) at Mikiel Anton Vassalli Street, San Ġiljan
St. Marggreth's Monastery (Monasteru Santa Margerita) at Bormla Square, Bormla
St. Scholastica's Monastery (Monasteru Santa Skolastika) at St. Scholastica Street, Birgu
St. Orsola's Monastery (Monasteru Santa Ursola) at St. Orsola Street, Valletta
St. Augustine's Convent (Kunvent Santu Wistin) at Old Bakeries Street, Valletta
Our Lady of Grotto's Convent (Kunvent tal-Madonna ta' l-Għar) at St. Domenic Square, Rabat
Cappuchine's Convent (Kunvent tal-Kappuċini) at Frangisk Saver Fenech Street, Floriana
St. Frances' Convent of Conventional Franciscans Brothers (Kunvent San Franġisk tal-Patrijiet Franġiskani Konventwali) at Republic Street, Valletta
St. Frances' Convent of Minor Franciscans Brothers (Kunvent San Franġisk tal-Patrijiet Franġiskani Minuri) at St. Paul Street, Valletta
Patrijiet Ġiżwiti's Convent at Scicluna Street, Naxxar
St. Liberatas' Convent (Kunvent Santa Liberata) at Cappuchines Street, Kalkara
Our Lady of Monte Carmel's Convent (Kunvent Madonna tal-Karmnu) at Tower Road, Sliema
St. John of the Cross' Convent (Kunvent San Ġwann tas-Salib) at Sir Temi Zammit Avenue, Ta' Xbiex
St. Theresa of Baby Jesus' Convent (Kunvent Santa Tereża tal-Bambin Ġesù) at Valley Road, Birkirkara
Salesians of Don Bosco - Provincial's Delegate House  at 10, St. John Bosco Street, Sliema
Sacred Heart of Jesus' Seminary (Seminarju tal-Qalb ta' Ġesù) at Enrico Mizzi Street, Rabat, Gozo
Archbishop's Seminary (Seminarju ta' l-Arċisqof) at Virtus Street, Rabat
Missionary Society of St. Paul (Soċjetà Missjunarja ta' San Pawl) at St. Agatha Street, Rabat
Agustinean Sisters' Monastery (Sorijiet Agostijani) at Fleur-de-Lys Road, Birkirkara
Dorotey Sisters' Monastery (Sorijiet Dorotej) at Alessandro Curmy Street, Rabat
Dominican Sisters' Monastery (Sorijiet Dumnikani) at Alessandro Curmy Street, Rabat
Franciscan Sisters Missionars of Mary's Monastery (Sorijiet Franġiskani Missjunarji ta' Marija) at St. Francis Street, Balzan
Franciscan Sisters of Sacred Heart of Mary's Monastery (Sorijiet Franġiskani tal-Qalb bla Tebgħa ta' Marija) at Canon Bonnici Street, Ħamrun
Franciscan Sisters of Sacred Heart of Jesus' Monastery (Sorijiet Franġiskani tal-Qalb ta' Ġesù) at Nazju Falzon Street, Msida
Missionary Carmelities Sisters' Monastery (Sorijiet Karmelitani Missjunarji) at Anton Calleja Street, Kerċem, Gozo
Missionary Sisters of Charity's Monastery (Sorijiet Missjunarji tal-Karità) at St. Paul Street, Bormla
Jesus of Nazareth's Monastery (Monasteru Ġesù Nazzarenu) at St. Gregory Street, Żejtun
Ursuline Sisters -  Convent, Creche and Formation House(Sorijiet Orsolini) @ Karm Galea Street, Sliema
St Joseph of  Apparition Sisters' Monastery (Sorijiet ta' San Ġużepp ta' l-Apparizzjoni) at Rue D'Argens, Gżira
Monasteru Bon Pastur at Dmejda Street, Balzan
Sisters of Charity, Provincial House (Sorijiet tal-Karità) at Tarxien Road, Tarxien
Sacred Heart Sisters' Monastery at Sacred Heart Street, San Ġiljan
Daughters of the Sacred Heart Congregagtion' Church of Immaculate Conception at Nigret, Zurrieq
Christ the King's Convent at Notabile Road, Birkirkara
Sorijiet Ulied Marija Għajnuna ta' l-Insara at Republic Street, Rabat, Gozo

Christianity in Malta
Malta
Monasteries and convents
Religious organisations based in Malta
Malta
Monasteries and convents